Karminadle, gehaktyz, karbinadle, kardinadle - a Silesian dish, meatballs traditionally prepared from pork. When served with potato pureé, kasza or rice, they constitute a traditional Upper Silesian karminadle.

Generally, karminadle are small, round and often flattened cutlets made from pork or a combination of pork and beef, although more commonly historically from rabbit meat, due to the ongoing rabbit breeding tradition in Upper Silesia. Karminadle used to be a holiday-only dish, but it is now an everyday, all-year food item.

Karminadle, sliced in half, may be served cold on bread or bread rolls.

See also
Polish cuisine
Silesian cuisine

References

Polish cuisine
Silesian cuisine

Rabbit dishes